Matthew Graham McKay (born 11 January 1983) is a retired Australian professional footballer who last played for Australian A-League club Brisbane Roar, and previously with the Australian national team. 
McKay currently holds the club's record for league appearances, 272. McKay played for Brisbane Roar since their first season in the A-League, and was their club captain up until the 2010–11 season, in which he led Brisbane to their first ever A-League championship and premiership. Following this triumphant victory McKay sought a new challenge in the first division of the Scottish Premiership with Rangers. McKay played an integral role in Australia's second placing in the 2011 AFC Asian Cup notably with 30m cross to centre forward Harry Kewell. He was also part of the Australian squad at the 2014 World Cup and 2015 AFC Asian Cup.

Club career 
McKay spent his formative youth years at both the QAS and AIS.  McKay's first club signing was in 1991 for the Sunnybank Saints Soccer Club, competing under the Queensland Christian Soccer Association. McKay was signed by NSL team the Brisbane Strikers in 2001, where he stayed until the conclusion of the 2003–04 National Soccer League season. McKay's last game for the Strikers was a 4–1 Victory over Adelaide United in the Elimination Final #1 as the Strikers could only level the tie 4–4 and bow out of the finals on away goals.

Brisbane Roar 
McKay signed on as an inaugural member of the, then, Queensland Roar prior to the 2005–06 season – the first in the history of the A-League. McKay was given the number 17 shirt, which he has retained throughout his career at the Roar. Initially signed as a squad player behind the more established South Korean duo Hyuk-Su Seo and Tae-Yong Shin, McKay quickly got his opportunity due to a career-ending injury suffered by Shin in the clubs' first ever A-League fixture, against the now defunct, New Zealand Knights. Following the departure of club captain, Craig Moore midway through the 2009–10 season, McKay was named as club captain. He has played the highest number of games for the Roar with 184 appearances, scoring 21 goals.

McKay led Brisbane to their first A-League premiership and championship in 2011. The Roar topped the table, and continued their record-breaking 28-game (run finished at 36) unbeaten run with a miraculous 4–2 (2–2 aet) penalty shoot-out win over the Central Coast Mariners in the 2011 A-League Grand Final. It was reported after the match that a stirring speech by McKay at half-time in extra time boosted the Roar's morale sufficiently to unbelievably overcome a 2–0 deficit.

During his time at Brisbane Roar, McKay had a loan spell in 2009 during the A-League off season.. He joined Changchun Yatai F.C. in the Chinese Super League where he made 15 appearances.

Rangers 
On 16 August 2011 Rangers confirmed the signing of McKay awaiting a work-permit, which was granted three days later, with a UK work visa granted a week later. McKay made his Rangers debut against Dundee United on 10 September 2011, coming on as a late substitute.

On 10 January 2012, McKay played and scored in a 4–1 Premier League win over Scottish Premier League team Kilmarnock F.C. On 12 January 2012, it was reported that he had rejected the chance to go on loan to Al Ittihad who reportedly made an offer to Rangers of a loan-to-buy deal.

Busan IPark 
Rangers began to have financial problems and on 14 February 2012 a dispute with HMRC came to a head when the business was placed into administration. Rangers were deducted 10 points as per SPL rules, which left them 14 points behind leaders Celtic.

On 22 February 2012, Rangers confirmed that they had agreed a fee with South Korean club Busan IPark for midfielder Matt McKay.

Changchun Yatai 
In January 2013, McKay signed a two-year deal with Chinese Super League side Changchun Yatai. In July 2013, McKay mutually terminated his contract by the club.

Brisbane Roar 
On 11 August 2013, McKay was announced as Brisbane Roar Australian Marquee for the next 2 seasons

International career 

McKay represented Australia at U-20 level in the 2003 FIFA World Youth Championship.

On 16 August 2006, McKay came on as a substitute for Australia in the 90th minute of the 2007 Asian Cup qualifying match against Kuwait at Aussie Stadium for his first Socceroo cap.

McKay would have to wait until 28 January 2009 for his second cap, starting in Australia's 2011 Asian Cup qualifying match against Indonesia in Jakarta. He would also feature in two more qualification games for the 2011 Asian Cup, starting against Kuwait on 5 March 2009 at Canberra Stadium and playing the second half of the return tie against Indonesia on 3 March 2010 at Suncorp Stadium.

McKay missed out on Pim Verbeek's 2010 FIFA World Cup squad, however he returned to the Socceroos under new manager Holger Osieck and featured in three of Australia's friendlies in the leadup to the 2011 AFC Asian Cup. He came off the bench in the match against Paraguay on 9 October 2010 at the Sydney Football Stadium as well as coming off the bench against Egypt in Cairo on 17 November 2010.

McKay was selected for the 2011 AFC Asian Cup squad by Holger Osieck, and started in the team's pre-tournament friendly against the United Arab Emirates on 5 January 2011 in Al Ain. McKay went on to play a part in every game Australia played at the tournament, initially coming off the bench in the first two games against India and South Korea. He was named in the starting 11 for both the final group stage match against Bahrain and the subsequent quarter-final match against Iraq, and played a vital role in the latter, leading Australia to a 1–0 extra time victory, executing an inch-perfect cross for striker Harry Kewell to head into the goal for the match winner. McKay retained his starting position for the semi-final against Uzbekistan, and was again a key player for Australia in the team's 6–0 win, setting up three goals and being awarded man of the match. Due to McKay's excellent form, he was retained in the starting XI by Osieck for the Asian Cup Final, playing the full 120 minutes as the Socceroos lost 1–0 to Japan.

McKay captained Australia for the first time on 7 December 2012 against Guam in the 2013 EAFF East Asian Cup qualifiers. Australia won the match 9–0.

McKay also represented Australia at the 2014 World Cup in Brazil, playing in his preferred midfield position.

McKay was named as part of Australia's 2015 AFC Asian Cup squad. He made his first appearance of the tournament as a starter in Australia's 2nd group game against Oman, scoring Australia's first goal of the game off a Trent Sainsbury header, in an eventual 4–0 win.

Career statistics

Club 

1 – includes A-League final series statistics
2 – includes Korean FA Cup and FFA Cup statistics
3 – includes FIFA Club World Cup statistics; AFC Champions League statistics are included in season commencing after group stages (i.e. ACL and A-League seasons etc.)

International

Honours

Club 
Brisbane Roar
 A-League Premiership: 2010–11, 2013–14
 A-League Championship: 2010–11, 2013–14

International 
Australia
 AFC Asian Cup: 2015
 AFC Asian Cup Runners-Up: 2011

Individual 
 Brisbane Roar Gary Wilkins Medal: 2006–07
 Brisbane Roar Players Player of the Year: 2006–07, 2010–11
 Brisbane Roar Members Player of the Year: 2006–07, 2010–11
 Football Media Association Player of the Year 2010–11
 PFA Footballer of the Year: 2010–11
 PFA A-League Team of the Season: 2010–11
 PFA A-League Team of the Decade: (2005–2015)

References

External links 

 Aussie Footballers McGowan to McLelland 
 
 

1983 births
A-League Men players
Brisbane Roar FC players
Association football midfielders
Soccer players from Brisbane
Australian expatriate soccer players
Australia international soccer players
Expatriate footballers in South Korea
Expatriate footballers in China
Expatriate footballers in Scotland
Australian expatriate sportspeople in South Korea
Australian expatriate sportspeople in China
Australian expatriate sportspeople in Scotland
National Soccer League (Australia) players
K League 1 players
Scottish Premier League players
Brisbane Strikers FC players
Incheon United FC players
Chinese Super League players
Changchun Yatai F.C. players
Rangers F.C. players
Busan IPark players
2011 AFC Asian Cup players
2014 FIFA World Cup players
2015 AFC Asian Cup players
Australian Institute of Sport soccer players
Sportsmen from Queensland
Living people
AFC Asian Cup-winning players
Marquee players (A-League Men)
Australian soccer players